The 1971 Western Championships, also known as the Cincinnati Open,  was a combined men's and women's tennis tournament played on outdoor clay courts at the Cincinnati Tennis Club in Cincinnati, Ohio in the United States that was part of the 1971 Pepsi-Cola Grand Prix circuit. The tournament was held from August 2 through August 8, 1971. Stan Smith and Virginia Wade won the singles titles.

Finals

Men's singles
 Stan Smith defeated  Juan Gisbert, Sr. 7–6, 6–3

Women's singles
 Virginia Wade defeated  Linda Tuero 6–3, 6–3

Men's doubles
 Stan Smith /  Erik van Dillen defeated  Sandy Mayer /  Roscoe Tanner 6–4, 6–4

Women's doubles
 Helen Gourlay /  Kerry Harris defeated  Gail Chanfreau /  Winnie Shaw 6–4, 6–4

References

External links
 
 Association of Tennis Professionals (ATP) tournament profile

Cincinnati Open
Cincinnati Masters
Cincinnati Open
Cincinnati Open
Cincinnati Open